Paul Walde (6 February 1876 – after 1926) was a German organist, choral director and composer.

Life 
Walde was born in Dresden in 1876 as the son of Jakob W. Zimmermann (1850–1896) and Agnes Schneider (1849–1927). After attending the citizen's school in his hometown, he studied music at the Königliches Konservatorium Dresden from 1897 to 1900. Among his teachers were Emil Robert Höpner in organ, Carl Heinrich Döring in piano and Wilhelm Rischbieter in music theory.

He advocated the extension of the harmony system to include chromaticism. In 1914, he was the founding director of his own music school, the "Dresdner Lehranstalt für Musik". In 1922, he became organist at the Katholische Hofkirche. Walde also conducted the Dresden Cäcilienchor. He also composed organ and piano pieces as well as Lieder (such as the Lied for one singing voice Freundschaft).

He was a member of the Tonkünstlerverein Dresden, the Verband Sächsischer Musikschuldirektoren, the Deutscher Tonkünstlerverband and the Verband katholischer Kirchenbeamten.

Walde, a Catholic, was married to Barbara Ponath (born 1881) from 1926.

Publications 
 Die Harmonie der Neuzeit. Neue Grundsätze für die Erweiterung und technische Bezeichnung der Diatonik und Chromatik. Printed as manuscript. Dresden 1910.

Further reading 
 Paul Frank, Wilhelm Altmann: Kurzgefaßtes Tonkünstlerlexikon. Für Musiker und Freunde der Tonkunst. 12th very extended edition, Carl Merseburger, Leipzig 1926.
 Friedrich Jansa (ed.): Deutsche Tonkünstler und Musiker in Wort und Bild. 2nd edition, Friedrich Jansa publishing house, Leipzig 1911.
 Erich H. Müller (ed.): Deutsches Musiker-Lexikon. W. Limpert-Verlag, Dresden 1929.

References

External links 
 

German classical organists
German composers
Sacred music composers
German conductors (music)
German music educators
1876 births
Musicians from Dresden
Year of death missing